Geballusa is a genus of beetles in the family Carabidae, containing the following species:

 Geballusa microtreta (Erwin, 1973)
 Geballusa nannotreta Erwin, 1994
 Geballusa oligotreta Erwin, 1994
 Geballusa polytreta (Erwin, 1973)
 Geballusa rex Erwin, 1994

References

Trechinae